Artemisia is the last opera of Domenico Cimarosa. The libretto, in three acts, is by Count Giovanni Battista Colloredo. Cimarosa died on 11 January 1801 before writing the music to Act III; the first performance, given at the Teatro La Fenice in Venice on 17 January 1801, also included interpolations by other hands in the first two acts.

In the opera, Artemisia, Queen of Caria,  the widow of Mausolus, has to deal with a variety of unwanted suitors.

The opera is not to be confused with Cimarosa's earlier opera (1797), Artemisia, Regina di Caria (Artemisa, Queen of Caria), which has a similar storyline, but is set to a different libretto.

References
Notes

Sources
 Rossi, Nick and Talmage Fauntleroy (1999). Domenico Cimarosa: his Life and Operas. Westport CT and London: Greenwood Press. 

Operas
1801 operas
Italian-language operas
Opera seria
Operas by Domenico Cimarosa
Operas set in Greece
Unfinished operas
Opera world premieres at La Fenice